Leptospermum benwellii is a species of shrub that is endemic to the Nymboida National Park in New South Wales. It has smooth bark, young branches with conspicuous flanges, narrow elliptical leaves, white flowers and thin-walled, bell-shaped to hemispherical fruit.

Description
Young branchlets are glabrous with conspicuous flanges. The lower side of young  leaves are hairy near their edge.

Taxonomy and naming
Leptospermum benwellii was first formally described in 2004 by Anthony Bean who published the description in the journal Telopea from specimens he collected near Munningyundo in the Nymboida National Park. The specific epithet (benwellii) honours the botanist Andrew Samuel Benwell.

Distribution and habitat
This leptospermum is only known from the type location where it grows in shrubland on steep, rocky slopes.

References

benwellii
Myrtales of Australia
Flora of New South Wales
Plants described in 2004